Acalypha ecuadorica is a species of plant in the family Euphorbiaceae. It is endemic to Ecuador.  Its natural habitat is subtropical or tropical dry forests.

References

Sources
 

ecuadorica
Endemic flora of Ecuador
Critically endangered plants
Taxonomy articles created by Polbot